Union Center is a village in Juneau County, Wisconsin, United States, along the Baraboo River. The population was 200 at the 2010 census.

History
Originally called Union, the village was named for the federal union of the United States. A post office called Union Center has been in operation since 1859.

Geography
Union Center is located at  (43.684067, -90.263841).

Demographics

2010 census
As of the census of 2010, there were 200 people, 95 households, and 58 families living in the village. The racial makeup of the village was 98.5% White and 1.5% Asian. Hispanic or Latino of any race were 0.5% of the population.

There were 95 households, of which 21.1% had children under the age of 18 living with them, 50.5% were married couples living together, 4.2% had a female householder with no husband present, 6.3% had a male householder with no wife present, and 38.9% were non-families. 32.6% of all households were made up of individuals, and 16.9% had someone living alone who was 65 years of age or older. The average household size was 2.11 and the average family size was 2.57.

The median age in the village was 49 years. 15.5% of residents were under the age of 18; 7.5% were between the ages of 18 and 24; 18% were from 25 to 44; 37% were from 45 to 64; and 22% were 65 years of age or older. The gender makeup of the village was 47.0% male and 53.0% female.

2000 census
As of the census of 2000, there were 214 people, 94 households, and 59 families living in the village. The population density was 267.1 people per square mile (103.3/km2). There were 99 housing units at an average density of 123.6 per square mile (47.8/km2). The racial makeup of the village was 99.07% White, and 0.93% from two or more races. Hispanic or Latino of any race were 1.40% of the population.

There were 94 households, out of which 25.5% had children under the age of 18 living with them, 47.9% were married couples living together, 13.8% had a female householder with no husband present, and 36.2% were non-families. 31.9% of all households were made up of individuals, and 18.1% had someone living alone who was 65 years of age or older. The average household size was 2.20 and the average family size was 2.77.

In the village, the population was spread out, with 21.5% under the age of 18, 2.8% from 18 to 24, 30.4% from 25 to 44, 25.2% from 45 to 64, and 20.1% who were 65 years of age or older. The median age was 43 years. For every 100 females, there were 94.5 males. For every 100 females age 18 and over, there were 86.7 males.

The median income for a household in the village was $34,063, and the median income for a family was $48,750. Males had a median income of $27,500 versus $23,750 for females. The per capita income for the village was $17,121. About 5.7% of families and 8.3% of the population were below the poverty line, including 6.7% of those under the age of eighteen and none of those 65 or over.

References

Villages in Juneau County, Wisconsin
Villages in Wisconsin